Akure is a city in south-western Nigeria. It is the capital and largest city of Ondo State. The city had a population of 403,000 as at the 2006 population census.

History

Pre 1914

Rock engravings dating back to the Mesolithic period, have been discovered on the outskirts of Akure. Also the oldest Homo sapiens fossil ever found in West Africa thus far was discovered there, dating back to around 11,000 years ago. The Akure Kingdom is regarded as one of the sixteen ancient Ekiti kingdoms.

Oral tradition states that Akure was founded by a figure by the name Alakure, but the current dynasty of rulers and the modern Akure Kingdom was founded by Omoremilekun Asodeboyede, a descendant of Oduduwa. The Prince left Ile-Ife, where Oduduwa ruled, in search of a place to settle after passing a strict test administered by Oduduwa himself, and eventually founded the city upon his arrival in the Akure region and his conquering of the Alakure. Asodeboyede represents the wave of princely descendants from Ile-Ife who overthrow the indigenous rulers of the region. 
The Oba's Palace is located at the centre of the town, and was built in 1150 AD.
It has over 16 courtyards (ùà), with each having its unique purpose. Ùà Lílá (big courtyard, which serves as the town hall), Ùà Ùbúra (courtyard for swearing oaths), Ùà Jẹ́mifọhùn, Ùà Ùkómọ (courtyard for naming ceremonies), Ùà Ògògà (courtyard of the Ògògà), Ùà Oriole (c ourtyard for sacred religious oaths taken by chiefs and the king), Ùà Ojukoto (where religious ceremonies are held), Ùà Agbeto (courtyard where babalawo and priests of Ifa meet to offer prayers and council), Ùà Ameshe (where criminals were punished), are some of the names of the courtyards. At present, a bigger and more modern palace is being built to the south of the old palace's grounds. Oja Oba, which means the Oba's Market, is just a stone's throw away from the Palace

Akure's King is known as the Deji of Akure and is supported by six (6) high chiefs (Iwarefa) in his or her domain. The totem of Akure is the Leopard and the father of Omoremilekun Omoluabi was himself called Ekun, meaning "Leopard" (this was his regnal name). It is for this reason that every descendant of the Akure clan has been addressed by outsiders as Omo Ekun during the recitation of his or her praise poetry or, alternatively, as 'Omo Akure Oloyemekun', since Omoremilekun was said to have stayed for a while at Igbo Ooye before coming to the region that would become his kingdom.

1914–present 
In 1915, the colonial government merged the divisions of Owo, Ondo and Ekiti to form a new province with headquarters in Akure. In 1976, the town became the capital of Ondo State.

Adebiyi Adegboye Adesida Afunbiowo II was chosen as the Deji of Akure on 13 August 2010 to succeed the previous Oba Oluwadamilare Adeshina, who had been dethroned on 10 June 2010 for sacrilegious misdeeds.  Afunbiowo's daughter, the Omoba Adetutu, was appointed princess regent following his demise on the 30th of November, 2013.

In 2015, Omoba Aladetoyinbo Ogunlade Aladelusi successfully emerged the new monarch of Akure after beating twelve other contestants nominated by the Osupa ruling house to become the 47th Deji of Akure and was appointed as chairman of the Ondo State Council of Obas by the incubent Governor of Ondo State;Governor Akeredolu.

Geography
Akure lies about 7°25’ north of the equator and 5°19’ east of the Meridian. The town is situated in the tropical rainforest zone in Nigeria.

Economy
Akure has two television and eight radio stations: NTA Akure, Ondo State Television, Sunshine Radio Akure, Adaba FM, Futa FM, Empire Radio,  Positive FM Akure, Orange FM, Galaxy Radio, Crest FM, and Breeze FM.

Akure is the trade center for a farming region where cocoa, yam, cassava, maize and tobacco are grown. Cotton is also grown and used to weave cloth. Grains like rice, beans, and millet are very common as they are the major sources of carbohydrate.

Shopping and restaurants
In Akure, there are many establishments which include restaurants such as Chicken Republic, Tantalizers, Captain Cook, Mr. Bigg's, LAH Kitchen & Lounge among other. 
The major supermarkets are NAO supermarket, AFOYEM supermarket, CECI supermarket, PEP stores, Omega supermarket, and DE CHRIS supermarket, OUK supermarket, God's Love supermarket amongst others while there's also a Shoprite Akure mall.

Health and education
The state specialist hospital in Akure is equipped and staffed with trained medical personnel to cater to the health needs of the populace. To supplement the efforts of the state specialist hospital in this regard, there are other government health centres and private clinics. 'Abiye'  health programme of Governor Mimiko's administration was recognized by World Health Organization (WHO) as one of the best health programs on maternal health programs with the establishment of Mother-Child hospital in Akure.

The city has tertiary institutions which include: the Federal University of Technology Akure, Federal College of Agriculture, School of Nursing and Midwifery, and School of Health Technology. It also has famous secondary schools like St. Thomas Aquinas College, Oyemekun Grammar School, St. Louis Grammar School, and Fiwasaye Girls' Grammar School. The first two are for boys while the latter two are for girls in the tradition of early schools in Nigeria. The town also hosts to Federal Government Girls' College and St. Peter's Unity Secondary School, amongst many others. Primary schools are widespread but most of them often lack quality, there are few that offer quality education but are accessible to few elites.

City
There are two other communities with their separate kings, cultures and traditions beside the Akure kingdom. The more prominent of the pair is Isinkan, while the second of them is Isolo. The ruler of Isinkan is known as the Iralepo while that of Isolo is known as the Osolo of Isolo. In the olden days, the three communities (Akure, Isinkan and Isolo) were located some distances apart. The war with the Benin empire in the pre-colonial period necessitated that the three communities move closer together however, and they have occupied their current positions ever since. Other nearby towns include Isarun, Ilara, Igbaraoke, Iju, Itaogbolu, Idanre, Owo, Ikere and Ondo.

The most influential Deji in recent history was Oba Adesida I who was known as Afunbiowo. Several Dejis after him were his direct descendants. Akure is also the birthplace of notable Nigerians like Chief Olu Falae (a one time presidential candidate of a political party who reigns as a titled aristocrat of the realm), legal luminary Dr Akinola Aguda and several personalities in the academia, industry, the military, judiciary and the civil service. Philip Emeagwali, the Gordon Bell Prize winner, and the mother of King Sunny Adé are both citizens of Akure. Akure is also the hometown of Ralph Alabi, a former chairman of Guinness Nigeria, and Kole Omotosho.

Sports
For sporting events, Akure has a stadium with a capacity to sit 15,000 spectators. A new state-of-the-art stadium is under construction on the northern flank of the city. The town is the home base of Nigeria Premier League team, the Sunshine Stars.

Religion
Akure is a city with varied, liberal religious leanings. Christianity, Islam and Traditional or Totemistic worship form the basis of faith for most residents. There is a preponderance of churches in the city. The Central Mosque, on the Oba Adesida Road, is a major landmark in the city. Worthy of mention is the fact that all of the Akures enjoy a peaceful co-existence.

Politics 
Akure is currently been represented in the state's house of assembly by Hon. Simeon Toluwani Borokini (Akure South I), Hon. (Dr.) Abiodun Faleye (Akure North), and Hon. Olajide David Sunday (Akure South II).

Notable people
Kayode Ajulo, Lawyer & Arbitrator 
Harry Garuba (1958–2020), poet and professor of African Studies and English
Hon. Simeon Toluwani Borokini, Politician
Godfrey Oboabona, Footballer

Gallery

References

The Case for a New Federal Capital in Nigeria

 
State capitals in Nigeria
Populated places in Ondo State
Cities in Yorubaland
Cities in Nigeria
Populated places established in the 12th century